Burgruine Edenvest (Edenvest castle ruins) is the ruins of a rock castle in the Thomatal municipality in the Tamsweg district of the state of Salzburg, Austria.

See also
List of castles in Austria

References

This article was initially translated from the German Wikipedia.

Castles in Salzburg (state)